ENA/VASP homology proteins or EVH proteins are a family of closely related proteins involved in cell motility in vertebrate and invertebrate animals. EVH proteins are modular proteins that are involved in actin polymerization, as well as interactions with other proteins. Within the cell, Ena/VASP proteins are found at the leading edge of Lamellipodia and at the tips of filopodia. Ena, the founding member of the family was discovered in a drosophila genetic screen for mutations that act as dominant suppressors of the abl non receptor tyrosine kinase. Invertebrate animals have one Ena homologue, whereas mammals have three, named Mena, VASP, and Evl.

Ena/VASP proteins promote the spatially regulated actin polymerization required for efficient chemotaxis in response to attractive and repulsive guidance cues. Mice lacking functional copies of all three family members display pleiotropic phenotypes including exencephaly, edema, failures in neurite formation, and embryonic lethality.

A sub-domain of EVH is the EVH1 domain.

VASP

Vasodilator-stimulated phosphoprotein (VASP)  45-residue-long tetramerization protein domain  which regulates actin dynamics in the cytoskeleton. This is vital for processes such as cell adhesion and cell migration.

Function
Ena/VASP proteins are actin cytoskeletal regulatory proteins. Ena/VASP proteins are often found in dynamic actin structures like filopodia and lamellipodia, but the precise function in their formation is controversial. Ena/VASP proteins remain processively bound to growing barbed (+) ends of an actin filaments. They promote actin filament elongation both by delivering monomeric actin to the barbed (+) ends as well as protecting these ends from F-actin capping protein.

Structure
The tetramerisation domain has a right-handed alpha helical coiled-coil structure.

References

EVH domain
Protein domains
Proteins
Cell movement
Cytoskeleton
Cell biology